The 1865 State of the Union Address was written by the 17th president of the United States, Andrew Johnson.  It was presented to the United States Congress on Monday, December 4, 1865.  He stated, "Our thoughts next revert to the death of the late President by an act of parricidal treason. The grief of the nation is still fresh. It finds some solace in the consideration that he lived to enjoy the highest proof of its confidence by entering on the renewed term of the Chief Magistracy to which he had been elected; that he brought the civil war substantially to a close; that his loss was deplored in all parts of the Union, and that foreign nations have rendered justice to his memory."  The American Civil War had ended, and now it was time for the Reconstruction era to begin.

References

State of the Union addresses
Presidency of Andrew Johnson
39th United States Congress
State of the Union Address
State of the Union Address
State of the Union Address
State of the Union Address
December 1865 events
State of the Union